Kindred Spirits is a 1984 Australian film about a young girl who has a psychic experience at Bondi Beach.

Cast
Julieanne Newbould as Julie
John Ewart as Tommy
Patricia Kennedy as Miss Morris
Nicholas Eadie as Ben
David Waters as Billy

References

External links

Kindred Spirits at Austlit
Kindred Spirits at Screen Australia
Kindred Spirits at Peter Malone
Kindred Spirits at ABC

Australian horror films
1984 films
Films directed by Peter Fisk
1980s English-language films
1980s Australian films